The women's 500 metres races of the 2015–16 ISU Speed Skating World Cup 1, arranged in the Olympic Oval, in Calgary, Alberta, Canada, were held on 13 and 15 November 2015.

Lee Sang-hwa of South Korea won the first race, while Zhang Hong of China came second, and Brittany Bowe of the United States came third. Marsha Hudey of Canada won the first Division B race.

In the second race, Zhang was the winner, with Lee in second place, and Heather Richardson-Bergsma of the United States in third. Yekaterina Aydova of Kazakhstan won the second Division B race.

Race 1
Race one took place on Friday, 13 November, with Division B scheduled in the morning session, at 10:04, and Division A scheduled in the afternoon session, at 13:34.

Division A

Note: NR = national record.

Division B

Race 2
Race two took place on Sunday, 15 November, with Division A scheduled at 14:02, and Division B scheduled at 16:57.

Division A

Division B

Note: NR = national record.

References

Women 0500
1